NGC 55, is a Magellanic type barred spiral galaxy located about 6.5 million light-years away in the constellation Sculptor. Along with its neighbor NGC 300, it is one of the closest galaxies to the Local Group, probably lying between the Milky Way and the Sculptor Group. It has an estimated mass of (2.0 ± 0.4) × 1010 .

Nearby galaxies and group information
NGC 55 and the spiral galaxy NGC 300 have traditionally been identified as members of the Sculptor Group, a nearby group of galaxies in the constellation of the same name.  However, recent distance measurements indicate that the two galaxies actually lie in the foreground.

It is likely that NGC 55 and NGC 300 form a gravitationally bound pair.

Visual appearance
The Webb Society Deep-Sky Observer's Handbook writes the following about NGC 55:  "Nearly edge-on and appears asymmetrical with some signs of dust near the bulge, which is diffuse, broad and somewhat elongated with the south edge sharp; southeast of the bulge it is strongly curved and lined with 4 or 5 faint knots; north edge of the curve is sharp."  Burnham calls it "one of the outstanding galaxies of the southern heavens", somewhat resembling a smaller version of the Large Magellanic Cloud.

See also
 NGC 4236 
 NGC 4631

Notes

average(6.9 ± 0.7, 7.5 ± 1.1) = ((6.9 + 7.5) / 2) ± ((0.72 + 1.12)0.5 / 2) = 7.2 ± 0.7

References

External links

 NGC 55 in Sculptor
 SEDS: Spiral Galaxy NGC 55
 

NGC 0055
NGC 0055
NGC 0055
0055
-07-01-013
01014
072b
18260707
Virgo Supercluster